Dogos XV is a professional rugby union team based in Cordoba, Argentina. The team was founded in 2019 as Ceibos to compete in Súper Liga Americana de Rugby and was Argentina's second professional franchise.

The team was rebranded for the 2023 Super Rugby Americas season as Dogos XV, the new name for the team based in Cordoba. and controlled by the Unión Cordobesa de Rugby (Córdoba Rugby Union).

It also partecipated at a Cross-border competition in November 2022 against Brazil XV, Paraguay XV and Tucumán.

Dogos it's also the Córdoba's provincial team nicknamed that won the Campeonato Argentino 7 times, the last in 2012.

Stadium
In 2020, a "permanent" home stadium for Ceibos was not formally announced but the Ceibos played two preseason matches scheduled at Barrio Los Boulevares in Cordoba, Argentina.

From 2023 home stadium is the same of Tala Rugby Club.

Current squad 
The Dogos XV squad for the 2023 Super Rugby Americas season is:

 Senior 15s internationally capped players are listed in bold.

Honours
 Cross Border Competition (1): 2022

References

External links
  

Argentine rugby union teams
Sport in Córdoba Province, Argentina
Rugby clubs established in 2019
2019 establishments in Argentina
2021 disestablishments in Argentina
Super Rugby Americas